Cherthala, (formerly Shertalai, Shertallai or Shertallay) is a Municipal town and a Taluk located at  National highway 66  in the district of Alappuzha, in the state of Kerala, India. Cherthala is the satellite town and industrial hub of Alappuzha.

In the local administration, Cherthala is a municipality, while in the state administrative structure Cherthala is a taluk and its headquarters are in the district of Alappuzha.

Etymology
According to local legend, Vilwamangalam Swamiyar, the Kerala Hindu saint, while travelling through Cherthala, found an idol of the Devi with its head immersed in a muddy pond. The swami understood the divinity of the idol, took it out of the mud, cleaned it and consecrated it in a temple near the pond. Thus the place is believed to have gotten its name as cher meaning "mud" and thala meaning "head" in Malayalam. The deity of the temple has the name Cherthala Karthiyayani.

Climate

Demographics
According to 2011 census report, Cherthala Municipality had population of 45,827 of which 22,192 are males while 23,635 are females.

Population of Children with age of 0-6 is 3988 which is 8.70% of total population of Cherthala (M). In Cherthala Municipality, Female Sex Ratio is of 1065 against state average of 1084. Moreover, Child Sex Ratio in Cherthala is around 911 compared to Kerala state average of 964. Literacy rate of Cherthala city is 97.02% higher than state average of 94.00%. In Cherthala, Male literacy is around 98.58% while female literacy rate is 95.59%.

Educational organizations

College of Engineering, Cherthala, managed by IHRD, Government of Kerala
 Bishop Moore Vidyapith, Cherthala

Industries

Landmarks 
Cherthala Town Municipality has 35 wards. The town is well known after the Karthyayani Devi temple, located in the center of the town. Two more sub-temples dedicated to Shiva and Vishnu are also located on the northern side of the main temple. A sub-temple dedicated to Lord Ayyappa, also known as Kaavudayan and another dedicated to Kshethrapalakan believed to be Devi's temple caretaker are located on the southern corner of the main temple. Thousands of devotees coming from different 'karas' (localities) of Cherthala participate in the Padayani, vela thullal and pooram pattu, the main rituals conducted during the temple festival. A large pond exists in front of the Taluk office that belongs to the Karthyayani Devi temple. One can see many roosters flocking around the temple premises. These roosters are the offerings of the devotees, an ancient custom followed in many devi temples of Kerala. The temple is administered by Travancore Devaswom Board.

Another temple in Cherthala town is the Muttathu Thirumala Devaswam temple. Lord Narasimha presiding in the form of Saligrama and Sree Venkatachalapathy Moorthy with bhoo devi and sree devi are the deities of this temple. The temple conducts its annual festival either ahead of the Karthyayani Devi's festival or soon after that. The Pallivetta is a procession where it is believed that Goddess is going for the divine hunting. The annual festival lasts for eight days.

Notable people
Irayimman Thampi – Carnatic musician as well as a music composer from Kerala
 Vayalar Ramavarma – Malayalam poet and film lyricist
 A. K. Antony – thrice Chief minister of Kerala in UDF Ministry, Indian Defence Minister
 Vayalar Ravi – former Home minister of Kerala in UDF Ministry, Union Cabinet Minister of Overseas Indian Affairs and Minister for Parliamentary Affairs
 K. R. Gouri Amma – First revenue minister of Kerala State, First women minister of kerala state. 
 S. D. Shibulal – chief executive officer and managing director of Infosys
 Karunakara Guru – founder of Santhigiri Ashram
 PS Karthikeyan – former Secretary, S.N. Trust, Former Director of SNDP Yogam, Former Member of the Legislative Assembly – Aroor, Chief Editor of Dinamani daily
 P. Parameswaran – Director, Bharatheeya Vichara Kendram
 Jagannatha Varma – Kathakali artist, actor in Malayalam film and serial
 Thiruvizha Sivanandan – renowned Karnatic Violinist and teacher
 Rajeev Alunkal – film lyricist, poet, orator And Chairman Kumaranasan Smarakam, Govt of Kerala
 Vayalar Sarath Chandra Varma – film lyricist
 Rajan P. Dev – Malayalam film actor and drama/theater personality
 S. L. Puram Sadanandan – Malayalam playwright and film scriptwriter
 Chelangatt Gopalakrishnan – writer and film critic
 Joy J. Kaimaparamban – English and Malayalam author
Jomon T. John – Indian cinematographer
Sijoy Varghese – Actor, Ad Film Director
 Itty Achuthan – major contributor of ethno-medical information for the compilation of Hortus Malabaricus
 Palackal Thoma Malpan – founder of the Carmelites of Mary Immaculate
 Mgr. Joseph C. Panjikaran – founder of the Medical Sisters of St. Joseph
 P. J. Thomas, Polayil – Chief Secretary, Kerala
 Radhika – Malayalam cine actress
 C. K. Chandrappan – communist leader
 Syam Pushkaran – Malayalam scriptwriter
 P. Thilothaman – Former minister for food and civil supplies, Kerala State

References

External links

 Cherthala Municipality

Suburbs of Kochi
Cities and towns in Alappuzha district
Populated coastal places in India